Margaret of Valois (1295–1342) was a French noblewoman.  She was a daughter of Charles, Count of Valois, and his first wife, Margaret, Countess of Anjou. She was also a sister of King Philip VI of France.

In 1310, she married Guy I of Châtillon, Count of Blois.  They had three children together:
 Louis II of Châtillon, Count of Blois (d. 1346) and Lord of Avesnes, married Jeanne of Hainault, Countess of Soissons.
 Charles of Blois, Duke of Brittany (d. 1364), married Joan of Penthièvre, Duchess of Brittany.
 Marie of Blois, married:
 in 1334 to Rudolph, Duke of Lorraine (d. 1346)
 , Count of Leiningen-Dagsburg.

References

Sources

House of Valois
French countesses
1295 births
1342 deaths
14th-century French people